Puckington is a village and civil parish, situated  south-east of Taunton and  west of Yeovil in the South Somerset district of Somerset, England. The parish includes the hamlet of South Bradon.

History

The name of the village means the settlement of Puca's people.

Before the Norman Conquest the manor was held under Muchelney Abbey but after 1066 was taken over by Roger de Courcelles. It was subsequently held by a succession of families until the execution of the Duke of Suffolk in 1553 when it reverted to the Crown, and sold to the Portmans of Orchard Portman.

Puckington was part of the hundred of Abdick and Bulstone.

Governance

The parish council has responsibility for local issues, including setting an annual precept (local rate) to cover the council's operating costs and producing annual accounts for public scrutiny. The parish council evaluates local planning applications and works with the local police, district council officers, and neighbourhood watch groups on matters of crime, security, and traffic. The parish council's role also includes initiating projects for the maintenance and repair of parish facilities, as well as consulting with the district council on the maintenance, repair, and improvement of highways, drainage, footpaths, public transport, and street cleaning. Conservation matters (including trees and listed buildings) and environmental issues are also the responsibility of the council.

The village falls within the Non-metropolitan district of South Somerset, which was formed on 1 April 1974 under the Local Government Act 1972, having previously been part of Langport Rural District. The district council is responsible for local planning and building control, local roads, council housing, environmental health, markets and fairs, refuse collection and recycling, cemeteries and crematoria, leisure services, parks, and tourism.

Somerset County Council is responsible for running the largest and most expensive local services such as education, social services, libraries, main roads, public transport, policing and fire services, trading standards, waste disposal and strategic planning.

It is also part of the Yeovil county constituency represented in the House of Commons of the Parliament of the United Kingdom. It elects one Member of Parliament (MP) by the first past the post system of election.

Religious sites

The Church of St Andrew dates from the 13th century and has been designated by English Heritage as a Grade II* listed building.

References

External links

Villages in South Somerset
Civil parishes in Somerset